Lord Herbert Lionel Henry Vane-Tempest, KCVO (6 July 1862 – 26 January 1921), was a British company director. He was a director of the Cambrian Railways and died in the Abermule train collision in January 1921.

Life
Vane-Tempest was born into, on his father's side, an aristocratic family of partial Ulster-Scots descent, being the son of The 5th Marquess of Londonderry and his wife, Mary Cornelia Edwards, and brother of The 6th Marquess of Londonderry. He was born on 6 July 1862. 
Vane-Tempest was a Justice of the Peace of both Montgomeryshire and Merionethshire. He was awarded the Royal Officers' Decoration and was appointed Knight Commander, Royal Victorian Order. He was a Major and Honorary Lieutenant-Colonel in the Durham Artillery Militia.

In 1905, Vane-Tempest became a director of the Cambrian Railways. The following year, he inherited Plas Machynlleth and a considerable fortune from his mother, Mary. In 1910, Lord Herbert was appointed the High Sheriff of Montgomeryshire. Also in 1910, he became a director of a new company set up to revive the moribund Mawddwy Railway.

Just before noon, the train was approaching  where it was due to cross the west-bound stopping train from Whitchurch, Shropshire. Due to a failure by the staff at Abermule, the train from Whitchurch was allowed to proceed westward while the express train was approaching the station. The two trains collided west of Abermule station. Seventeen people were killed, including Lord Herbert Vane-Tempest, aged 58. He was buried in Machynlleth on Saturday 29th January.

Winston Churchill was Vane-Tempest's first cousin once removed and inherited several thousand pounds from a trust set up by Vane-Tempest's grandmother (Churchill's great-grandmother) to aid her male descendants who were not due to inherit the family titles, as Vane-Tempest died a bachelor. Churchill was able to put this inheritance towards the purchase of Chartwell.

References

External links
 

1862 births
1921 deaths
Cambrian Railways
Herbert
Herbert
Railway accident deaths in the United Kingdom
Accidental deaths in Wales
Younger sons of marquesses